Entergalactic may refer to:
 
 Entergalactic (album), a 2022 album by Kid Cudi
 Entergalactic (TV special), a TV special on Netflix
Entergalactic (Original Score), a film score composed by Dot da Genius and Plain Pat
 "Enter Galactic (Love Connection Part I)", a song by Kid Cudi from Man on the Moon: The End of Day
 "Enter Galactic!", the 17th episode of Pokémon: Diamond and Pearl: Battle Dimension